Barbara Thompson (October 15, 1924 – September 23, 2010) was an educator and the Superintendent of Public Instruction of Wisconsin from 1973 to 1981.

Born in McFarland, Wisconsin and raised on a dairy and tobacco farm, the former Barbara Ruth Storck graduated from the University of Wisconsin–Platteville in 1956 and received her master's degree and doctorate from the University of Wisconsin–Madison. Initially, Thompson started to teach in a one-room schoolhouse and was a school administrator. She campaigned for the State Superintendent office, while recovering from a broken arm in 1973, and was the first woman to be elected to the office. During her administration, the teachers in Hortonville, Wisconsin went on strike. Thompson also required teachers in Wisconsin to go through continuing education and to have their teachers licenses renewed once every five years. She died in Bradenton, Florida.

References

External links

American school administrators
Educators from Wisconsin
American women educators
People from McFarland, Wisconsin
People from Bradenton, Florida
University of Wisconsin–Platteville alumni
University of Wisconsin–Madison alumni
1924 births
2010 deaths
Superintendents of Public Instruction of Wisconsin
Women in Wisconsin politics
21st-century American women